Erik Jon Koch (born October 4, 1988) is an American mixed martial artist who competed in the Welterweight division of the Ultimate Fighting Championship. A professional competitor since 2007, he formerly competed for the WEC.

Background
Koch was enrolled in Tae Kwon Do classes at the age of four, and reached his black belt by the age of ten, piquing his interest in MMA. With help from his older brother, Keoni, who helps run an MMA gym in Iowa with Dave Sherzer (Hard Drive MMA), Erik started MMA-style striking and grappling before the age of 14. Koch would later drop out of Washington High School (Cedar Rapids, Iowa) to pursue a professional career in mixed martial arts.

Mixed martial arts career

Early career
After compiling a 2–0 amateur record, Koch made his professional MMA debut in 2007. Fighting primarily in Iowa, he amassed an undefeated streak of 8–0 before being signed to World Extreme Cagefighting.

World Extreme Cagefighting
Koch was scheduled to fight Wagnney Fabiano at WEC 43 on September 2, 2009, but was forced to withdraw from the bout due to an undisclosed injury while training.  Koch was replaced by WEC newcomer Mackens Semerzier. Now Koch made his WEC debut against Jameel Massouh on December 19 for WEC 45. Koch defeated Massouh via unanimous decision.

Koch was defeated by WEC newcomer Chad Mendes via unanimous decision on March 6, 2010 at WEC 47.

Koch rebounded from his first professional loss as he faced Bendy Casimir on June 20, 2010 at WEC 49. Koch won via first-round triangle choke submission.

Koch was expected to face Josh Grispi on November 11, 2010 at WEC 52. However, due to the UFC/WEC merger, the fight was scratched as Grispi was awarded a title fight with current WEC Featherweight Champion José Aldo to determine the inaugural UFC Featherweight Champion. Koch defeated promotional newcomer Francisco Rivera via first-round TKO, earning Knockout of the Night honors.

Ultimate Fighting Championship

2011
On October 28, 2010, World Extreme Cagefighting merged with the Ultimate Fighting Championship. As part of the merger, all WEC fighters were transferred to the UFC.

Koch was expected to face Cub Swanson on March 3, 2011 at UFC Live: Sanchez vs. Kampmann.  However Swanson was forced out of the bout with an injury.

Koch faced Raphael Assunção at UFC 128, replacing the injured Manvel Gamburyan.  He won the fight via first round knockout, earning Knockout of the Night honors.

Koch was expected to face Cub Swanson on July 2, 2011 at UFC 132.  However, Swanson was forced out of the bout with another injury.

Koch faced The Ultimate Fighter 12 winner Jonathan Brookins on September 17, 2011 at UFC Fight Night 25.  He won the fight via unanimous decision.

2012
Koch was expected to face Dustin Poirier on February 4, 2012 at UFC 143.  However, Koch pulled out of the bout citing an injury and was replaced by Ricardo Lamas, who was then replaced by Max Holloway due to injury as well.

Koch was expected to face José Aldo for the UFC Featherweight Championship on July 21, 2012, at UFC 149.  However, Aldo was forced out of the bout citing an injury and the bout was postponed.

Koch was expected to face José Aldo on October 13, 2012 at UFC 153 for the UFC Featherweight Championship.  However, Koch was forced out of the bout with another injury and replaced by Frankie Edgar.

2013
Koch faced Ricardo Lamas on January 26, 2013 at UFC on Fox 6. He lost via TKO in the second round.

Koch faced Dustin Poirier on August 31, 2013 at UFC 164. He lost the fight via unanimous decision.

2014
After two consecutive losses, Koch returned to lightweight and faced Rafaello Oliveira on February 22, 2014 at UFC 170. He won the fight by TKO in the first round.

Koch faced Daron Cruickshank on May 10, 2014 at UFC Fight Night 40. He lost the fight via TKO due to a head kick and punches in the first round.

2015
Koch was expected to face Ramsey Nijem on July 25, 2015 at UFC on Fox 16.  However, Koch was forced from the bout with injury and replaced by promotional newcomer Andrew Holbrook.

2016
Koch was expected to face Drew Dober on January 2, 2016 at UFC 195. However, Koch pulled out of the bout in early December citing another injury and was replaced by Scott Holtzman.

Koch was expected to face Joe Proctor on May 29, 2016 at UFC Fight Night 88. However, Proctor pulled out of the fight on April 21 citing injury and was replaced by Shane Campbell. Koch won the fight via submission in the second round.

A rescheduled bout with Drew Dober was expected to take place on September 10, 2016 at UFC 203. However on August 11, Koch pulled out again due to injury and was replaced by promotional newcomer Jason Gonzalez.

2017
Koch was expected to face Tony Martin on January 15, 2017 at UFC Fight Night 103. However, Koch pulled out of the fight on December 12 with yet another injury and was replaced by Alex White.

Koch faced Clay Guida on June 25, 2017 at UFC Fight Night 112. He lost the fight by unanimous decision.

2018
Koch faced Bobby Green on January 27, 2018 at UFC on Fox: Jacaré vs. Brunson 2. He lost the fight via unanimous decision.

Koch was scheduled to face promotional newcomer Dwight Grant in a welterweight bout on December 15, 2018 at UFC on Fox 31. However, Koch was removed from the card on November 28 for undisclosed reasons and replaced by Zak Ottow.

2019
Koch faced Kyle Stewart on July 27, 2019 at UFC 240 in a welterweight bout. He won the fight via unanimous decision.

2020
On December 23, 2020, it was reported that Koch was released by the UFC.

Koch was suspended by USADA for 18 months for testing positive for 3'-hydroxy-stanozolol, a metabolite of stanozolol, as the result of a urine sample collected on October 3, 2020. He became eligible to return on April 3, 2022.

Championships and accomplishments
World Extreme Cagefighting
Knockout of the Night (One time) vs. Francisco Rivera 
Ultimate Fighting Championship
Knockout of the Night (One time) vs. Raphael Assunção 
Mainstream MMA
Mainstream MMA Lightweight Championship (2008)
Midwest Cage Championship
MCC 20 Featherweight Tournament Winner (2009)

Mixed martial arts record

|Win
|align=center|16–6
|Kyle Stewart
|Decision (unanimous)
|UFC 240 
|
|align=center|3
|align=center|5:00
|Edmonton, Alberta, Canada
|
|-
|Loss
|align=center|15–6
|Bobby Green
|Decision (unanimous)
|UFC on Fox: Jacaré vs. Brunson 2 
|
|align=center|3
|align=center|5:00
|Charlotte, North Carolina, United States
|
|-
|Loss
|align=center|15–5
|Clay Guida
|Decision (unanimous)
|UFC Fight Night: Chiesa vs. Lee
|
|align=center|3
|align=center|5:00
|Oklahoma City, Oklahoma, United States
|
|-
|Win
|align=center|15–4
|Shane Campbell
|Submission (rear-naked choke)
|UFC Fight Night: Almeida vs. Garbrandt
|
|align=center|2
|align=center|3:02
|Las Vegas, Nevada, United States
|
|-
| Loss
| align=center| 14–4
|Daron Cruickshank
| TKO (head kick and punches)
| UFC Fight Night: Brown vs. Silva
| 
| align=center| 1
| align=center| 3:21
| Cincinnati, Ohio, United States
| 
|-
| Win
|align=center|14–3
| Rafaello Oliveira
| TKO (punches)
| UFC 170
| 
|align=center| 1
|align=center| 1:24
|Las Vegas, Nevada, United States
|
|-
| Loss
|align=center| 13–3
| Dustin Poirier
| Decision (unanimous)
| UFC 164
| 
|align=center| 3
|align=center| 5:00
|Milwaukee, Wisconsin, United States
|
|-
| Loss
|align=center| 13–2
| Ricardo Lamas
| TKO (elbows)
| UFC on Fox: Johnson vs. Dodson
| 
|align=center| 2
|align=center| 2:32
|Chicago, Illinois, United States
|
|-
| Win
|align=center| 13–1
| Jonathan Brookins
| Decision (unanimous)
| UFC Fight Night: Shields vs. Ellenberger
| 
|align=center| 3
|align=center| 5:00
|New Orleans, Louisiana, United States
|
|-
| Win
|align=center| 12–1
| Raphael Assunção
| KO (punch)
| UFC 128
| 
|align=center| 1
|align=center| 2:32
|Newark, New Jersey, United States
| 
|-
| Win
|align=center| 11–1
| Francisco Rivera
| TKO (head kick and punches)
| WEC 52
| 
|align=center| 1
|align=center| 1:36
|Las Vegas, Nevada, United States
| 
|-
| Win
|align=center| 10–1
| Bendy Casimir
| Submission (triangle choke)
| WEC 49
| 
|align=center| 1
|align=center| 3:01
|Edmonton, Alberta, Canada
| 
|-
| Loss
|align=center| 9–1
| Chad Mendes
| Decision (unanimous)
| WEC 47
| 
|align=center| 3
|align=center| 5:00
|Columbus, Ohio, United States
| 
|-
| Win
|align=center| 9–0
| Jameel Massouh
| Decision (unanimous)
| WEC 45
| 
|align=center| 3
|align=center| 5:00
|Las Vegas, Nevada, United States
| 
|-
| Win
|align=center| 8–0
| Tom Ahrens
| Submission (rear-naked choke)
| Midwest Cage Championships 20
| 
|align=center| 2
|align=center| 3:13
|West Des Moines, Iowa, United States
|
|-
| Win
|align=center| 7–0
| Will Shutt
| Submission (rear-naked choke)
| Midwest Cage Championships 20
| 
|align=center| 2
|align=center| 3:33
|West Des Moines, Iowa, United States
|
|-
| Win
|align=center| 6–0
| Joe Pearson
| Submission (triangle choke)
| Mainstream MMA 9: New Era
| 
|align=center| 1
|align=center| 3:00
|Cedar Rapids, Iowa, United States
|
|-
| Win
|align=center| 5–0
| Eric Wisely
| Decision (unanimous)
| Mainstream MMA 7: Vengeance
| 
|align=center| 3
|align=center| 5:00
|Cedar Rapids, Iowa, United States
| 
|-
| Win
|align=center| 4–0
| TJ O'Brien
| Submission (armbar)
| Mainstream MMA 6: Evolution
| 
|align=center| 1
|align=center| 0:42
|Dubuque, Iowa, United States
| 
|-
| Win
|align=center| 3–0
| Tyler Combs
| TKO (punches)
| Xtreme Fighting Organization 17
| 
|align=center| 1
|align=center| 2:37
|Crystal Lake, Illinois, United States
| 
|-
| Win
|align=center| 2–0
| Micah Washington
| Submission (armbar)
| Mainstream MMA 5: Heavy Duty
| 
|align=center| 1
|align=center| N/A
|Cedar Rapids, Iowa, United States
| 
|-
| Win
|align=center| 1–0
| Prentiss Wolf
| Submission (rear-naked choke)
| Mainstream MMA 4: Epic
| 
|align=center| 1
|align=center| 2:30
|Cedar Rapids, Iowa, United States
|

See also
 List of male mixed martial artists

References

External links

Official UFC Profile
 

American male mixed martial artists
Mixed martial artists from Iowa
Featherweight mixed martial artists
Mixed martial artists utilizing taekwondo
Mixed martial artists utilizing Brazilian jiu-jitsu
Living people
1988 births
Sportspeople from Cedar Rapids, Iowa
People from Linn County, Iowa
American male taekwondo practitioners
American practitioners of Brazilian jiu-jitsu
Ultimate Fighting Championship male fighters